Yang Zhi is a fictional character in Water Margin, one of the four great classical novels in Chinese literature. Nicknamed "Blue Faced Beast", he ranks 17th among the 36 Heavenly Spirits, the first third of the 108 Stars of Destiny.

Background
Yang Zhi is descended from Yang Ye, a general in history made famous by the folk story Generals of the Yang Family -- a saga of the family's patriotism stretching from him to his great-grand child. Seven chi tall, Yang Zhi has red whiskers on his chin and a blue birthmark on his face, which earns him the nickname "Blue Faced Beast". A highly skilled fighter and archer, he combats with either a long sabre or a spear. He serves as a middle-ranking officer under Grand Marshal Gao Qiu in Dongjing (東京; present-day Kaifeng, Henan), the imperial capital of the Song Empire.

Gao Qiu sends Yang Zhi and several officers to escort rare minerals and plants, known as huashigang (花石綱), to Dongjing for the decoration of a park of Emperor Huizong. Yang loses the freight assigned him when his boats capsize in the Yellow River during a storm. Fearing punishment, he goes on the run. When he learns that his offence is pardoned in a wide-ranging amnesty, he returns to Dongjing in hope of being reinstated in his job.

On the way, Yang Zhi runs into Lin Chong at Liangshan Marsh, who wants to cut off and present his head to the bandit chief Wang Lun as his ticket to join the stronghold. After a long fight, neither wins. Wang Lun appears, stops the fight and asks Yang Zhi to join his band. He reckons that Yang could be a counterbalance to Lin, a formidable fighter who he fears might usurp his position. But Yang declines, vowing to uphold his ancestor's reputation.

Selling his precious sabre
In Dongjing, Yang Zhi tries to bribe his way back into his previous job. But Gao Qiu boots him from his office when Yang comes to explain his case.

Having spent all his money, Yang Zhi has no choice but to take his family heirloom, a precious sabre, to sell at a busy marketplace. The sabre has the rare properties of slicing metal and hair with ease and killing without being stained with blood. Fascinated by the sabre, hooligan Niu Er wants to snatch it away from Yang. In the scuffle, Yang accidentally kills Niu. He surrenders himself to the local magistrate. As Niu was a public nuisance, many local residents appeal for lenient sentence on Yang's behalf. He is exiled to Daming Prefecture.

Escorting the convoy of birthday gifts
In Daming Yang Zhi gains the attention of the prefect Grand Secretary Liang Shijie, who wants to tap his abilities. Liang arranges for Yang Zhi to joust with Zhou Jin, one of his better warriors, confident that he would prove himself deserving of a position in front of all his military men. Yang Zhi beats Zhou easily. However, another officer Suo Chao, who is the martial arts teacher of Zhou, feels humiliated and asks to contest with him. They have a dazzling fight with neither prevailing. Liang, impressed by both, promotes them to the same position.

Liang Shijie picks Yang Zhi to escort valuables to Dongjing as his birthday gift to his father-in-law Grand Tutor Cai Jing. Yang insists that the escort party be kept small and dressed up to look like traders so as not to attract potential robbers. Liang agrees to his requests. For fear of misstep, Yang is very demanding on the soldiers during the journey, including beating them with twigs when they dawdle and pushing them to cover distances in daytime under a blazing sun. They come to rest in a grove on the Yellow Soil Ridge (黃泥崗), where Chao Gai and his six confederates, intent on seizing the valuables, are taking shelter under the trees in the guise of date merchants. Bai Sheng, posing as a wine seller, comes over the ridge. As the weather is very hot, Chao's group buys and finishes the wine in one of Bai's buckets. Then Liu Tang takes one scoop from the other bucket without paying, which is snatched by Bai and emptied back into it. Seeing that Liu looks all right after sipping from that scoop and not aware that the remaining bucket is now drugged, Yang, who has forbidden purchase from Bai out of caution, is persuaded by his men to relent. He too takes a sip. Soon he and his men fall over numb in their limbs. Chao Gai and his party cart away the gifts.

Becoming an outlaw
Yang Zhi is the first to get up as he has drunk the least. Depressed, he abandons his men for fear of punishment. As Yang has been harsh to them, the soldiers return to Liang Shijie to incriminate him as an accomplice in the hijack. Furious, Liang orders his arrest.

Meanwhile, Yang Zhi comes to know Cao Zheng, a martial arts student of Lin Chong. Yang has dined in Cao's inn but leaves without paying as he is penniless. Cao catches up with him and the two fight. Cao, noticing that Yang's combat skill is of the warrior calibre, soon calls off the fight to inquire his identity. Upon learning Yang's misfortune, Cao advises him to go to Mount Twin Dragons (二龍山) to join the outlaw band led by Deng Long. At the foot of the Mount Twin Dragons, Yang runs into Lu Zhishen and the two clash suspecting hostility. As it is a matching fight, they eventually stop and introduce each other. Lu, who has also come to join Deng, is barred from going up the hill via its one access road by the chief, who finds the monk a threat. At Cao's inn, the inn owner suggests that he and Yang pretend to have drugged Lu and present him tied-up to Deng. Fooled, Deng lifts the barricade to let them in. They kill Deng and seize the stronghold. Yang Zhi becomes the second-in-command at Mount Twin Dragons under Lu Zhishen.

After his defeat by the bandits of Liangshan Marsh, the imperial general Huyan Zhuo flees to Qingzhou (in present-day Shandong) in hope of redeeming himself by wiping out the bandits there. One of the strongholds is Mount Twin Dragons, which, finding Huyan a tough opponent, requests help from Liangshan. Song Jiang, Liangshan's then second-in-command, comes to Qingzhou with a force and captures Huyan. The bandits of Mount Twin Dragons, including Yang Zhi, are absorbed into Liangshan.

Death
Yang Zhi is appointed as one of the Eight Tiger Cub Vanguard Generals of the Liangshan cavalry after the 108 Stars of Destiny came together in what is called the Grand Assembly. He participates in the campaigns against the Liao invaders and rebel forces in Song territory following amnesty from Emperor Huizong for Liangshan. 

Yang Zhi dies of illness during the campaign against Fang La, just after the conquest of Dantu County (丹徒縣; in present-day Zhenjiang, Jiangsu).

See also
 List of Water Margin minor characters#Yang Zhi's story for a list of supporting minor characters from Yang Zhi's story.

References
 
 
 
 
 
 
 

36 Heavenly Spirits
Fictional characters from Shanxi